Almon is an unincorporated community in Newton County, in the U.S. state of Georgia.

History
A post office called Almon was established in 1886, and remained in operation until 1931.

References

Unincorporated communities in Newton County, Georgia
Unincorporated communities in Georgia (U.S. state)